Pierre Uytterhoeven is a screenwriter. He won the Academy Award for Best Original Screenplay in 1966 for his work with Claude Lelouch in A Man and a Woman. In 1986 he worked with Lelouch again on the film's sequel, A Man and a Woman: 20 Years Later.

Filmography
 1977 : The Simple Past (writer)

External links

Best Original Screenplay Academy Award winners
Year of birth missing (living people)
Living people